Terzolas (Tergiolàs in local dialect) is a comune (municipality) in Trentino in the northern Italian region Trentino-Alto Adige/Südtirol, located about  northwest of Trento.

Terzolas borders the following municipalities: Malè, Caldes and Cles.

Demographic evolution

References

Cities and towns in Trentino-Alto Adige/Südtirol